Nikola Trojanović (29 September 1928 – 28 August 2019) was a Yugoslav swimmer. He competed in the men's 200 metre breaststroke at the 1952 Summer Olympics.

References

1928 births
2019 deaths
Croatian male swimmers
Yugoslav male swimmers
Olympic swimmers of Yugoslavia
Swimmers at the 1952 Summer Olympics
Sportspeople from Dubrovnik
Male breaststroke swimmers